The Canon EOS 500N is a Single-Lens Reflex 35mm film camera. It was originally known in Japan as the New EOS Kiss, and EOS Rebel G in North America, was introduced in 1996 and replaced in 1999 by the Rebel 2000.

Specs of the EOS 500N/Rebel G 
The body of the Rebel G is plastic, weighing 370g. The only colors available were black or a mix of silver and black. One of the features is that the Rebel G has an EF lens mount making it compatible with any EF lens. The viewfinder offers a 0.7x magnification, 90% coverage, center auto focus, wide auto focus and many more. The Rebel G shooting modes consisted of 6 basic modes, full auto, portrait, landscape, macro, sports and night scene. It also has 5 advanced modes, P, Av, Tv, M, A-DEP. These modes would continue on in the Rebel G series. The camera features a built in flash, and it had a frame per second rate of 1(FPS). The fastest shutter speed with flash was measured at 1/90 of a second.

References

External links

500N